Loftus is a market town and civil parish in the Redcar and Cleveland borough of North Yorkshire, England. The town is located north of the North York Moors and sits between Whitby and Skelton-in-Cleveland. 

At the 2011 census, the town's parish population was 7,988. The parish includes the villages of Carlin How, Easington, Liverton, Liverton Mines and Skinningrove.

The town was formerly known as Lofthouse. The town's built-up area, including Liverton Mines, had a population of 4,824. It is near Brotton, Saltburn and Skelton-in-Cleveland.

History
The Loftus area has been inhabited since at least the 7th century. Folkloric evidence includes a house owned by Sigurd the Dane, who features in Macbeth as Siward, real evidence has been unearthed in recent times to support the picture of ancient settlement in the area. Loftus is recorded as "Lcotvsv" in the Domesday book, from Laghthus meaning low houses.

The Methodist preacher John Wesley is known to have preached in Loftus.

Anglo-Saxon royal burial site

The only known Anglo-Saxon royal burial site in north-east England is near Loftus.

Artefacts were discovered there from excavations which took place between 2005 and 2007. Finds include pieces associated with a rare bed burial in which a decorated female body is laid out on a decorated wooden bed accompanied by fine gold jewellery. The finds include a gold pendant, which would have belonged to a princess. as well as glass beads, pottery, iron knives, belt buckles and other objects.
The finds, which date back nearly 1400 years were discovered by members of the Teesside Archeological Society, led by Dr Steve Sherlock, in a 109-grave site at Street House, Loftus.
They are presently on show at the Kirkleatham Old Hall Museum.

Ironstone and Westfield House 
Victorian era Loftus was dominated by the ironstone mining industry and many inhabitants that live in Loftus can trace lineage back to ironstone miners. Westfield House in Duncan Place is one of the largest private properties in Loftus. It was built in 1871 by the Pease family, who owned ironstone mines in the locality, for the then mine manager, Thomas Moore. It was also owned by the manager of Boulby potash mine from the 1920s, for a while it was also council offices.

Oddfellows Hall
The Oddfellows Hall, in Loftus, was built in 1874 as the offices and meeting place of the local Oddfellows society. Oddfellows were friendly or mutual societies, set up and organised by people from different guilds representing various trades. Other societies existed for single trades, but when there were not enough people from one trade, especially in smaller towns, societies would be formed from an "odd" mixture of people, so giving the name "Oddfellows". The Loftus Oddfellows would raise money for their members. The Oddfellows Hall was unused from the early 1990s. Tees Valley Housing Association have now taken over ownership of the building and converted it from a large meeting hall into eight self-contained flats.

Climate
Loftus has an oceanic climate (Köppen: Cfb).

Religion and education

The two main churches in the town are St Leonard's (Church of England), and St Joseph and St Cuthbert (Roman Catholic). There are three primary schools: St.Joseph's RCVA Primary School, Handale Primary School, and Hummersea).

Transport

The A174 is the town’s main road. Loftus railway station opened in 1875, and closed to passengers in 1960. The line still operates through the station site, with freight services for Boulby Mine, and occasional passenger 'specials' for rail enthusiasts. The nearest open station is at Saltburn.

Community and culture
Loftus parish includes the settlements of Boulby, Carlin How, Cowbar (in Staithes), Easington, Handale, Liverton Mines, Liverton, Loftus, Scaling and Skinningrove.

Loftus’s facilities include: Loftus Swimming Baths (where the swimming group, Loftus Dolphins, train), Loftus Youth Club, Loftus Army Cadets, Scouts, Cubs etc. The town also has its own dance studio - Triple Dee Dance Studio - which offers dance classes for children age two upwards. The studio started inside the town hall and later the company moved into their own studio on Zetland Road. It also has a fire station and part-time police station.

Town hall 
Loftus Town Hall was built by the Earl of Zetland, erected by a Thomas Dickenson of Saltburn, and was first opened in 1879. During the World Wars of 1914–1918 and 1939–1945 some of the rooms were commandeered for the war effort. The Town Hall clock has faces north, east and west, but no face to the south as the residents of South Loftus were reluctant to contribute to the cost. The Town Hall remained in the ownership of the Zetland family until 1948, when it was purchased by the former Loftus Urban District Council for £2000.

In 1974 the ownership of the Town Hall transferred to the newly created Langbaurgh Borough Council, and eventually to Redcar & Cleveland Borough Council. In 1992 budget cuts threatened closure of the Town Hall, and Loftus Town Council moved into the building and took over responsibility for maintenance. Although the Town Council moved in 1996, it still organises functions in the Town Hall. The Loftus and District Flower Club meets every third Monday at the hall.

Leisure centre
Tees Valley Leisure Limited, which was established in 1999 as an Industrial and provident society, provides a variety of leisure services on behalf of Redcar & Cleveland Borough Council operating for the benefit of the community as a non-profit distributing organisation. They took over the running of Loftus Leisure Centre, which had been opened in 1981 to provide the community with swimming facilities. The centre was improved with the addition of a sauna suite in 1985 and a fitness suite in 1998.

Sport 
Loftus Cricket & Athletic Club is situated at the eastern end of Loftus on Whitby Road. The club have two senior teams: a Saturday 1st XI that compete in the Langbaurgh Cricket League and a Midweek Senior XI in the Esk Valley Evening League.

Notable people 

Among notable people who were born in or lived in Loftus were geologist Lewis Hunton (1814–1838), actress Faye Marsay born in 1986, and table tennis player Paul Drinkhall born in 1990.

See also
 Boulby Mine, near Loftus
 List of Royal Observer Corps Posts

References

External links

 Historical Photo Archive of Loftus from Redcar & Cleveland Borough Council
 Loftus Town Council,
 History of Loftus
 

 
Towns in North Yorkshire
Civil parishes in North Yorkshire
Redcar and Cleveland
Places in the Tees Valley